Orthetrum sagitta is a freshwater dragonfly species present in Africa. Its appearance is confirmed only in Sierra Leone, the records from Chad, Egypt, Nigeria and Sudan appear as misidentification. The common name for this species is Arrow Skimmer.

See also 
 Orthetrum

References 

Insects described in 1915
Insects of West Africa
Libellulidae